Stark Mountain (also known as General Stark Mountain) is a mountain in the Green Mountains in the U.S. state of Vermont. Stark Mountain is named after General John Stark, hero of the Battle of Bennington fought in 1777.

Drainage basin
Stark Mountain stands within the watershed of Lake Champlain, which drains into the Richelieu River in Québec, the Saint Lawrence River, and then eventually into the Gulf of Saint Lawrence. On the east side of the ridge, Stark Mountain drains into Mill Brook, thence into the Mad River, the Winooski River, and into Lake Champlain. On the west side of the ridge, Stark Mountain drains into the Huntington River and into the Winooski River.

Hiking
The closest side trail providing access to this section of the Long Trail is the Jerusalem Trail in Starksboro, Vermont, which is also named after John Stark.

In the summer, the hut becomes an overnight lodge for hikers.

See also
 List of mountains in Vermont
 Molly Stark

References

Mountains of Vermont
Fayston, Vermont
Landforms of Washington County, Vermont